Martin is an unincorporated community in Marion County, Florida, United States, located on County Road 25A. The community is part of the Ocala Metropolitan Statistical Area.

Geography
Martin is located at  (29.2936, -82.1906).

References

Unincorporated communities in Marion County, Florida
Unincorporated communities in Florida